The World Hope Stadium, commonly known as Hope Centre., is a football stadium in Kawangware, a suburb in Nairobi, Kenya. It is currently by the Nairobi City Stars of the Kenyan Premier League, and Administration Police and Kenya Revenue Authority of FKF Division One. The stadium has a capacity of 5,000 spectators.

References

Football venues in Kenya